Bekaboo is an Indian Hindi-language fantasy television series that premiered on 18 March 2023 on Colors TV. An adaptation of the successful French fairy tale novel Beauty and the Beast, it is produced by Ekta Kapoor and Shobha Kapoor under their banner Balaji Telefilms. It stars Shalin Bhanot, Eisha Singh and Antara Biswas.

Plot

Cast

Main
 Shalin Bhanot as Ranav: Ashwat's son; Yamini and Pratham's nephew; Aditya's cousin; Valaka's grandson
 Eisha Singh as Bela : Devlekha's reincarnation
 Monalisa as Yamini Raichand : Valaka's daughter; Pratham and Ashwat's sister ; Ranav's aunt

Recurring
 Abhishek Kumar as Aditya Raichand : Yamini'son ; Pratham and Ashwat's nephew; Ranav's cousin; Valaka's grandson
 Chetan Hansraj as Mr. Raichand: Yamini's husband; Aditya's father
 Bakul Thakkar as Bela's Father
 Richa Soni as Bela's Mother
 Ravi Jhankal as Narrator / Kaka 
 Viral Yadav
 Roselin Sonia Gomes
 Shubhaavi Choksey as Rani Pari: Queen of the Pari Lok, Devlekha's mother.
 Hrishikesh Pandey as Valaka : Pratham, Ashwat and Yamini's father.

Cameo appearances
 Shivangi Joshi as Rajpari Devlekha: Rani Pari's daughter; Pratham's wife (Dead)
 Zain Imam as Pratham: Valaka's eldest son; Ashwat and Yamini's elder brother; Devlekha's husband (Dead)
 Karan Jotwani as Ashwat: Valaka's son; Pratham and Yamini's brother; Ranav's father (Dead)
 Arjit Taneja as Valaka's son

Production

Casting
Initially, Mohsin Khan and Kushal Tandon was in talks to play male lead.

Later, Shalin Bhanot, Eisha Singh and Antara Biswas were signed as the lead.

Viral Yadav and Roselin Sonia Gomes were cast to portray a negative role was joined by Karan Jotwani.

The series also features Shivangi Joshi, Zain Imam and  Arjit Taneja  in cameo appearances.

Development
The series was announced by Balaji Telefilms for Colors TV in February 2023. The series is a remake of Beauty and the Beast.

Filming
In February 2023, principal photography commenced in Mumbai.

Release
The promos featuring the leads was released in February 2023.

See also
 List of programmes broadcast by Colors TV

References

External links
 Bekaboo on Colors TV
 
 Bekaboo on Voot

2023 Indian television series debuts
2020s Indian television series
Indian drama television series
Hindi-language television shows
Balaji Telefilms television series
Colors TV original programming